is a Japanese mixed-media project. It consists of various 2.5D stage plays, with the first play running in 2017. A manga series with art by hagi was serialized in Media Factory's shōjo manga magazine Monthly Comic Gene from January to October 2019 and was collected in two tankōbon volumes. A second manga series with art by Kairi Shimotsuki titled Rusted Armors: Daybreak has been serialized in the same magazine since May 2021 and has been collected in a single tankōbon volume. An anime television series by Kigumi also titled Rusted Armors: Daybreak aired from January to March 2022.

Characters

Media

Manga
A manga series with art by hagi was serialized in Media Factory's Monthly Comic Gene magazine from January 15 to October 15, 2019. It was collected in two tankōbon volumes.

A second manga series with art by Kairi Shimotsuki titled  began serialization in the same magazine on May 14, 2021. It has been collected in a single tankōbon volume.

Anime
In June 2019, an anime adaptation based on the project was announced. It was later revealed to be a television series produced by Kigumi, also titled Rusted Armors: Daybreak. The series is directed by Shinmei Kawahara, with Ohine Ezaki writing the series' scripts. It aired from January 9 to March 27, 2022, on Tokyo MX and other networks. Taiki Sato, Toshiki Masuda, and Ryūji Satō performed the opening theme song "Faith." Crunchyroll licensed the series.

Episode list

Notes

References

External links
Stage play official website 
Anime official website 

2022 anime television series debuts
Crunchyroll anime
Historical anime and manga
Media Factory manga
Shōjo manga
Stage play franchises
Television series based on plays